The SS Bruges was a Belgian cargo ship that was shelled by the  in the South Atlantic at .

Construction 
The SS Bruges was constructed in 1904 at the Joh. C. Tecklenborg A.G. shipyard in Geestemunde, Germany. She was completed in 1904 and sailed under the Belgian flag.

She had a quadruple 4cyl expansion engine. The engine was rated at 505 nhp.

Sinking 
On 9 July 1940, Bruges was shelled and sunk by Thor in the South Atlantic, . The 44 crew members were taken Prisoners of war.

References

Steamships of Belgium
Ships built in Bremen (state)
Cargo ships of Belgium
1904 ships
Maritime incidents in July 1940
Ships sunk with no fatalities
World War II shipwrecks in the South Atlantic